John Nelson (born July 21, 1953) is an American visual effects supervisor. He has won two Academy Awards for Best Visual Effects for his work on the film Gladiator (2000) and Blade Runner 2049 (2017). He has also been nominated for I, Robot (2004) and Iron Man (2008).

He also won the 2018 British Academy of Film and Television Arts for the Special Visual Effects in Blade Runner 2049

After graduating with high distinction from the University of Michigan in 1976, he worked as a cameraman, technical director and a director at the pioneering computer animation and commercial production company Robert Abel and Associates, where he won two Clio awards and earned six additional Clio nominations. Early in his career while at ILM, Nelson modeled, animated, lit and composited several shots for Terminator 2: Judgment Day (1991), including the iconic scene in which the shotgunned head of the chrome terminator splits open and reseals. He is a member of the Academy of Motion Picture Arts and Sciences, the Visual Effects Society, the International Cinematographers Guild and the Directors Guild of America.

References

External links

Full Nelson Inc. website for Visual Effects Supervisor John Nelson
"Bladerunner 2049 wins the 2018 Oscar for Visual Effects
Bladerunner 2049 wins the 2018 British Academy of Film and Television Arts award for the special visual effects in "Bladerunner 2049"
BAFTA interview with John Nelson on the visual effects process in "Bladerunner 2049"

1953 births
Living people
Visual effects supervisors
Best Visual Effects Academy Award winners
Best Visual Effects BAFTA Award winners
Artists from Detroit
University of Michigan alumni